P. is an abbreviation or acronym that may refer to:

 Page (paper), where the abbreviation comes from Latin pagina
 Paris Herbarium, at the Muséum national d'histoire naturelle
 Pani (Polish), translating as Mrs.
 The Pacific Reporter
 Pádraig Flynn, a former Irish politician

See also 
 P (disambiguation)
 P, the letter